The Ministry of Internal Affairs of Libya (وزارة الداخلية الليبية) is the interior ministry of Libya. The Ministry is headquartered in Tripoli.

Structure

Supreme Security Committee 
The Supreme Security Committee (SSC) was created by Order No. 20 of the National Transitional Council in October 2011 to provide a new revolutionary security apparatus to fill the security vacuum in the capital of Tripoli after the fall of Gadaffi. The order gave the SSC the task of providing security in the capital and charged it with the protection of state property, embassies and private property, as well as the creation of the appropriate security conditions that would contribute to the return to normal life. The Committee hired revolutionary fighters as the initial personnel.

After the formation of the transitional government the National Transitional Council transferred dependency of the Supreme Security Committee administratively and financially to the Interior Ministry. The SSC was restructured under the name of (the Supreme Security Committee temporary) and identified have a range of disciplines, and in view of what the Commission has achieved the desired goals, was authorized by the ministry to open branches in all Libyan cities to establish security in the entire country.

Organizational structure 
 Management of public affairs
 Information Security Management
 Operations Management
 Technical Affairs Department
 the Department of Legal Affairs
 Public Information Office
 Office of Inspection

National Police 
 Department on behalf of the fight against drugs.
 Dept. on behalf of the fight against economic crimes.
 Dept. on behalf of illegal immigration.

Notes

External links 
 Ministry of the Interior of Libya official homepage
 official Facebook page
 Supreme Security Committee official homepage

Libya
Government of Libya